St. Thomas' Church, Thuruthur is a Roman Catholic place of worship in the diocese of Kottapuram in the ernakulam  district of Kerala, India.

History
Thuruthur is a small hill also known as Mount Sinai by the early Jews who came to Crangannore from the Middle East for the spice trade. From early Jewish historic documents and from the name "Mount Sinai", it is believed that a synagogue existed there as a place of worship for the merchants.  

It is believed traditionally that St. Thomas visited this place called Mount Sinai for prayers, after landing in Musiris (Kodungalloor). St. Thomas preached the gospel of Jesus in this area and spread the good news to the surrounding areas. After the assassination of Thomas by a Hindu fanatic, the Christian communities established by St. Thomas flourished all over Kerala and different parts of India.

On the site of the present church there was a small shrine which was made with palm leaves by an early believer called Raphael Kunnathur (Kunnumpuram Raphael). This occurred in the time of Ambazhakkad Forane, of Syrian Christians. Later during the times of Latinisation, it was added as a sub-station to Thuruthipuram Parish, and hence become a Latin church.  One night, it is reported, people of the area (early Christians) heard the bells of the church chiming and as they came to the church they saw a powerful divine aura around the head of the statue of St. Thomas. 

The property, previously owned by the Kunnumpuram family, was registered to the Church only in 1990s, during the administrative period of Rev Fr Michael Thaleketty. The renovated church as seen today was constructed under the leadership of Rev Fr Jaiju Elenjikkal.

Healing well
There is a widespread tradition in this locality that when St. Thomas came to this hill, Mount Sinai, he found a miraculous spring which in later years became a well, which never dries even in the scorching summer of South India. There are many stories of healing effected by water from this well. People of different faiths also come in the hope of receiving a blessing by contact with the well water.

References

External links
 Directory entry, Catholic Churches India

Churches in Thrissur district